Alice Heine (February 10, 1857 – December 22, 1925) was an American-born Princess consort of Monaco, by marriage to Prince Albert I of Monaco. Marcel Proust used her as a model for the Princesse de Luxembourg in his novel, In Search of Lost Time. Her first husband was the Duke of Richelieu, and one of the titles of her second husband was Duke of Mazarin; she was thus unique in bearing the titles of both Cardinal Richelieu and Cardinal Mazarin.

Early life
She was born Marie Alice Heine at 900 Rue Royale, in the French Quarter of New Orleans, Louisiana. Her French father, Michel Heine, was a scion of a prominent German-rooted Berlin and Paris banking Jewish family. His brother was Armand Heine, and both were cousins of poet Heinrich Heine and of journalist and press publisher Gustav Heine, later Baron Heine von Geldern. Michel was born in Bordeaux, France, and moved to New Orleans in 1843, and become a successful financier and real-estate developer.  Her mother was Marie Amélie Céleste Miltenberger, daughter of Joseph Alphonse Miltenberger, an architect and cast-iron importer by trade of French Alsatian descent, and his Creole wife, Marie Céleste Dorfeuille.  Her family built three interconnected Miltenberger mansions on Rue Royale.  She had two younger brothers, Paul Henri and Isaac Georges.

The American Civil War sent the family back to France, where the teenaged Alice's youth and beauty, and her family's wealth, made a great impression in Parisian society. A & M Heine, her father's firm, helped finance Napoleon III's war with Prussia.

Michel and Amélie became regulars in the court of Napoleon III, who, along with the Empress Eugénie, became godparents to the New Orleans-born Heine.

Personal life 
She had been christened in New Orleans.  

She married her first husband, Marie Odet Armand Aimable Chapelle de Jumilhac, Marquis of Jumilhac then 7th Duke of Richelieu and Duke of Aiguillon, in Paris on February 27, 1875. They had one son and one daughter:

 Marie Odet Jean Armand Chapelle de Jumilhac (1875–1952), who became the 8th and last Duke of Richelieu, as well as the Duke of Aiguillon and Marquis of Jumilhac, upon the death of his father in Athens on June 28, 1880. In 1913, he married Eleanor Douglas Wise (1890-1972) of Maryland, United States, daughter of John Sergeant Wise. Without issue.
 Odile Marie Auguste Septimanie Chapelle de Jumilhac (1879–1974), who in 1905 married Gabriel Marie François Hippolyte Ferri Eugène de La Rochefoucauld (1875-1942), becoming the Countess de La Rochefoucauld and later on June 22, 1909 Princess de La Rochefoucauld-Montbel in Kingdom of Bavaria. They had a daughter, Anne Alice Elisabeth Amélie de La Rochefoucauld (1906-1980), who married twice and had no issue.

Princess of Monaco
Prince Albert's first wife, who was the daughter of a Scottish duke, was an oceanographer. She was credited with having caught the first specimen of Grimaldichthys profundissimus, long thought to be the deepest-living fish in the world's oceans. However, during her husband's long journeys at sea, Alice took a greater interest in the Monegasque opera season. The courtesan Caroline Otero (La Belle Otero), who had been a part-time lover of the prince between 1893 and 1897, recalled the prince fondly in her memoirs and claimed that he wasn't a virile man and suffered from erection difficulty.

Alice first met Albert I of Monaco in Madeira in 1879. At the time, the Hereditary Prince was still in an unhappy marriage with Lady Mary Victoria Douglas-Hamilton. The prince's first marriage was eventually annulled by the Church on January 3, 1880, and Alice and the prince began a relationship soon thereafter. The marriage to Prince Albert I of Monaco, Sovereign Prince of Monaco, occurred on October 30, 1889. According to Thomas Fouilleron, director of the Monaco Palace Archives, “Prince Albert I was deeply in love with her. It is one of the very first love marriages of the Principality”.

She brought a strong business acumen, showing an understanding far beyond her years. Having helped put her husband's principality on a sound financial footing, she would devote her energies to making Monaco one of Europe's great cultural centers with its opera, theater, and the ballet under the direction of the famed Russian impresario, Sergei Diaghilev. Her affair with composer Isidore de Lara resulted in Prince Albert slapping her in view of an audience at the Salle Garnier.

Alice and Prince Albert I separated judicially on May 30, 1902 (Monaco) and June 3, 1902 (France), but remained married. Upon the prince's death 20 years later, Alice became the Dowager Princess of Monaco. She did not remarry.

Legacy
Her former home in New Orleans is now the Café Amelie and advertises itself as a setting for weddings, receptions, special parties and the like.

References

External links 

|-

Heinrich Heine
1858 births
1925 deaths
People from New Orleans
American people of French-Jewish descent
Converts to Roman Catholicism from Judaism
House of Grimaldi
Princesses of Monaco
American expatriates in Monaco
Burials at Père Lachaise Cemetery
Monegasque Roman Catholics
Jewish royalty
American Jews